Fox was an Italian television channel, owned by Fox Networks Group Italy and broadcast in Italy by Sky Italia on Channel 112. Launched on July 31, 2003, coinciding with the launch of Sky Italy, it broadcast its programs in Italian and English.

In 2009, it started broadcasting in HD.

The channel ceased broadcasting on June 30, 2022, with Nat Geo/Wild and Baby TV remaining on air, until these channels closed on 1 October 2022, ending Disney Italia's distribution of networks through cable and satellite. Most of the channel's programming moved to Disney+'s Star hub.

Programming

References

External links
 Official website 

Italy
Italian-language television stations
Defunct television channels in Italy
Television channels and stations established in 2003
Television channels and stations disestablished in 2022
Former subsidiaries of The Walt Disney Company
2003 establishments in Italy
2022 disestablishments in Italy